Abwehr Lieutenant colonel Hermann Joseph Giskes (28 September 1896 – 28 August 1977), a First World War veteran and a survivor of Verdun, was an intelligence officer during World War II primarily stationed in the occupied Netherlands, and head of Abwehr Section IIIF. He is best known as one of the leading lights behind the Englandspiel operation. Giskes' activities were responsible for supplying a great deal of disinformation to British intelligence services for much of World War II, and for the arrest of more than 50 Special Operations Executive (SOE) agents, nearly all of whom were executed. Giskes first succeeded in gaining the partial cooperation of captured British agent Hubertus Lauwers, who sent encrypted messages (but missing security checks) back to the British SOE headquarters at Giskes' direction, under duress. Then dozens of agents parachuted in succession, and were captured by the Germans, along with tons of equipment.

When it became apparent that the penetration had been uncovered, Giskes on 1 April 1944 sent the following message in clear (unencrypted text) to London:
To [the SOE section chiefs] Messrs Blunt, Bingham and Succs Ltd., London.
In the last time you are trying to make business in Netherlands without our assistance stop we think this rather unfair in view of our long and successful co-operation as your sole agents stop but never mind whenever you will come to pay a visit to the Continent you may be assured that you will be received with the same care and result as all those who you sent us before stop so long.

At the end of the war, Giskes was interrogated by Robert Maxwell at Camp 20, Iserlohn, before release. He then worked for US intelligence services in Europe.

See also
Leo Marks - the SOE cryptographer who claimed to have become increasingly suspicious of Abwehr penetration of the Dutch circuit

Notes

References

Bibliography
 

 
  (Originally published by Bastei Lübbe as London ruft Nordpol : das erfolgreiche Funkspiel der deutschen militärischen Abwehr)

Abwehr personnel of World War II
1977 deaths
1896 births
Military personnel from Krefeld
German Army personnel of World War I